The 1994 Atlantic hurricane season was the final season in the most recent negative Atlantic multidecadal oscillation period ("low-activity era" or "cold phase") of tropical cyclone formation within the basin. Despite the below average activity, the season was very deadly, with almost 97% of deaths occurring during Hurricane Gordon, a devastating late-season tropical cyclone that severely impacted the Caribbean Sea, the Greater Antilles and the United States, and one of the longest-lived Atlantic hurricanes on record at the time. The season produced seven named tropical cyclones and three hurricanes, a total below the seasonal average. The season officially started on June 1 and ended on November 30, dates which conventionally limit the period during which most tropical cyclones form in the Atlantic Ocean. The first tropical cyclone, Tropical Storm Alberto, developed on June 30, while the last storm, Hurricane Gordon, dissipated on November 21. The season was unusual in that it produced no major hurricanes, which are those of Category 3 status or higher on the Saffir–Simpson hurricane scale. Aside from Chris, Florence, and Gordon, none of the storms exceeded tropical storm intensity.

Tropical Storm Alberto produced significant rainfall and flooding in the Southeastern United States, damaging or destroying over 18,000 homes. In August, Tropical Storm Beryl produced heavy rainfall in Florida, Georgia, South Carolina, and North Carolina, with moderate to heavy rainfall throughout several other states. Beryl caused numerous injuries, many of which occurred from a tornado associated with the tropical storm. Tropical Storm Debby killed nine people in the Caribbean in September. Hurricane Gordon was the most significant storm of the season, causing damage from Costa Rica to North Carolina among its six landfalls. Extreme flooding and mudslides from Gordon caused approximately 1,122 fatalities in Haiti. In addition, a nor'easter in December may have had tropical characteristics, though due to the uncertainty, it was not classified as a tropical system.



Seasonal forecasts 

Forecasts of hurricane activity are issued before each hurricane season by noted hurricane experts such as Dr. William M. Gray and his associates at Colorado State University. A normal season, as defined by the National Oceanic and Atmospheric Administration, has six to fourteen named storms, with four to eight of those reaching hurricane strength, and one to three major hurricanes. The 1994 forecast predicted that a total of 10 storms would form, of which six of the storms would reach hurricane status. The forecast also projected that three of the hurricanes would reach major hurricane status.

Seasonal summary 

In terms of tropical cyclone activity, the season was below average, with only seven named storms, three hurricanes, and no major hurricanes. It was one of only five Atlantic hurricane seasons without major hurricanes, the others being the 1968, 1972, 1986, and 2013 seasons, although records before 1944 are incomplete. No storms of hurricane intensity formed within the months of September and October for the first time since reliable records began in the 1940s. However, the month of November did feature two hurricane formations, the first time that occurred since 1980. The low seasonal activity is attributed to the presence of El Niño, which is a global coupled ocean-atmosphere phenomenon. The season officially began on June 1, and ended on November 30. These dates conventionally delimit the period of each year when the majority of tropical cyclones tend to form in the Atlantic Ocean.

The season's activity was reflected in a low cumulative accumulated cyclone energy (ACE) rating of 32. ACE is, broadly speaking, a measure of the power of the hurricane multiplied by the length of time it existed, so storms that last a long time, as well as particularly strong hurricanes, have high ACEs. ACE is only calculated for full advisories on tropical systems at or exceeding  or tropical storm strength.

Systems

Tropical Storm Alberto 

The first storm of the season formed on June 30 near the western tip of Cuba. Initially tracking westward, the depression turned towards the north, though it remained poorly defined. Early on July 2, the depression organized into Tropical Storm Alberto. The storm quickly weakened to a tropical depression over Alabama as it continued to the northeast, but retained a well-organized circulation. High pressures built to its north and east, causing the remnant tropical depression to stall over northwestern Georgia. It began a westward drift and dissipated over central Alabama on July 7.

Alberto triggered some of the worst flooding ever observed across portions of Georgia, Alabama, and Florida. As a result of the storm's slow motion,  of rain fell in some locations. Due to flash flooding, 33 deaths were reported, primarily in Georgia. Over 18,000 homes were damaged or destroyed, and in excess of 1,000 roads sustained damage. About  of crops were affected by the storm, and 218 dams failed. Total damage from the storm amounted to $1.03 billion (1994 USD). The flooding from Alberto is considered one the worst natural disasters in Georgia's history.

Tropical Depression Two 

The origins of the depression were from a broad upper-level trough that extended northeastward from The Bahamas. An area of convection developed near the Bahamas, spawning a low-pressure area on July 19. The next day, the system organized into Tropical Depression Two, after confirmation from the Hurricane Hunters. Upon developing, the depression was poorly organized, with most of the thunderstorms located south of the center. As it moved inland, it turned to the north, dissipating on July 21 near Charlotte, North Carolina. The remnant low continued northeastward across the northeastern United States, becoming unidentifiable on July 22 while entering Nova Scotia.

The depression was never forecast to attain tropical storm status. Officials issued flash flood watches for portions of the southeastern United States. Tropical Depression Two dropped light rainfall throughout the Southeastern United States, the Mid-Atlantic, and parts of New England. It was the first tropical system to make landfall in South Carolina since Hurricane Hugo. There were no reports of damage or casualties associated with Tropical Depression Two.

Tropical Storm Beryl 

After a slow start to the season, Tropical Storm Beryl formed as a tropical depression on August 14 in the Gulf of Mexico. The center moved slowly and erratically in response to an approaching trough, and after moving towards the north, the storm made landfall near Panama City, Florida as a tropical storm. The weakening storm accelerated towards the north-northeast, and the system was identifiable as a low-pressure system as far north as Connecticut.

Tropical Storm Beryl produced heavy rainfall in Florida, Georgia, South Carolina, and North Carolina, with moderate to heavy rainfall throughout several other states. Several rivers from Florida to New York approached or exceeded flood stage. Although no fatalities were directly related to Beryl, several injuries were reported, including 37 due to an associated EF3 tornado that touched down in Lexington, South Carolina. Property damage was estimated at $73 million (1994 USD).

Hurricane Chris 

Hurricane Chris originated from a tropical wave that emerged from the west coast of Africa on August 11 and tracked westward. The associated disturbance organized and was declared a tropical depression on August 16, while Tropical Storm Beryl was over land. The depression intensified into a tropical storm on August 17, and the next day it acquired hurricane intensity. Chris maintained hurricane strength for two days, before increased wind shear caused the cyclone to weaken. The storm remained away from land, passing to the east of Bermuda on August 21, before it merged with an extratropical baroclinic zone to the southeast of Newfoundland.

Hurricane Chris dropped  of rain on Bermuda, though no damage or fatalities were reported.

Tropical Depression Five 

A tropical wave that was first noted on August 17 tracked westward and reached the Caribbean on August 26. The wave moved across the Yucatán Peninsula, and developed into a tropical depression on August 29 in the Bay of Campeche. Moving west-northwestward, the system remained below tropical storm status, and made landfall near Tampico on August 31.

Tropical Storm Debby 

A tropical depression developed from another tropical wave on September 9. Surface observations and ship reports suggested that it developed into Tropical Storm Debby on September 10, despite poor organization evidenced by satellite imagery. Wind shear caused the system to deteriorate, and the circulation degenerated into a tropical wave on September 11.

Tropical Storm Debby killed four people and injured 24 on St. Lucia. Heavy rainfall caused flooding and mudslides, which washed away hillside shacks, eight bridges, and parts of roads. Flood waters were chest-high in some locations, and the storm's winds damaged banana plantations. Mudslides caused by the storm blocked roads, and water supply was disrupted. On Martinique, one person drowned and some towns were flooded. Downed trees made roads impassable, and up to 20,000 people on the island lost power. Three deaths occurred in the Dominican Republic, and a fisherman drowned off of Puerto Rico. Throughout the areas affected by Debby, it is estimated that hundreds of people were homeless.

Tropical Storm Ernesto 

A tropical wave exited Africa on September 18 with an area of organized deep convection. The wave was in a series of strong waves that exited Africa later than the climatological peak of the season. Wind shear was marginally favorable for development, and the depression intensified into Tropical Storm Ernesto on September 22.

After peaking, Ernesto entered an area of increasing wind shear and stronger upper-tropospheric flow, resulting in a steady weakening trend. After most of the convection diminished over the center, the storm weakened to a tropical depression on September 24. Subsequently, it decelerated and turned to a west-northwest drift. The remnants continued generally westward, occasionally redeveloping deep convection but never regenerating into a tropical cyclone. The remnants were no longer identifiable by September 29.

Tropical Depression Eight 

The eighth depression of the season formed with little convection on September 19 in the southwestern Caribbean. The area of convection lasted for several days moving from northwestern direction to the northeastern. The wave was estimated to have strengthened into Tropical Depression Eight on September 24 near the coast of Honduras. The depression made landfall in Mexico and dissipated the next day over Guatemala. Reports show that the remnants of Eight became Tropical Depression Ten. The storm dropped heavy precipitation in and around Belize.

Tropical Depression Nine 

Tropical Depression Nine started out as a well-defined cloud circulation that moved off the coast of Africa on September 26. The NHC declared Nine dissipated early on September 29, near Sal in the Cape Verde Islands.

Tropical Depression Ten 

The remnants of Tropical Depression Eight persisted over the northwestern Caribbean in late September. Convection increased and organized after a tropical wave reached the area. A circulation soon developed within the low-pressure area. It was estimated that Tropical Depression Ten formed on September 29 at 0600 UTC. A reconnaissance aircraft did not indicate a closed circulation due to the proximity with Cuba, which caused difficulties with satellite intensity estimates. The system was relatively disorganized, potentially moving ashore in western Cuba near Cabo San Antonio. The tropical depression entered the Gulf of Mexico on September 30 as it turned to the northwest. On September 30 at 0600 UTC, the tropical depression attained its peak intensity, winds had reached  and the minimum central pressure had dropped down to 1004 mbar. The depression was soon becoming absorbed by a larger non-tropical system in the southern Gulf of Mexico. By 1800 UTC on September 30, Tropical Depression Ten had been completely absorbed by the non-tropical system. Initial predictions from the National Hurricane Center estimated that the depression would rapidly develop into a tropical storm. The depression dropped heavy rainfall in Cuba, reaching  in a 24-hour period in Giron. The remnants of the depression dropped heavy rains in Florida, causing $5 million in damage (1994 USD).

Hurricane Florence 

After a quiet October, the month of November began with the formation of a subtropical depression on November 2. The storm intensified into a subtropical storm shortly thereafter before weakening to a depression the next day. Florence rapidly intensified and was upgraded to a hurricane on November 4. The intensification ceased shortly after it started and minor fluctuations in intensity took place over the following three days. Florence was subsequently upgraded to a Category 2 hurricane. A large extratropical system located to the north absorbed the storm on November 8.

Hurricane Gordon 

Hurricane Gordon was the final storm of the season. The system formed near Panama in the southwestern Caribbean Sea on November 8. Strengthening into a tropical storm, Gordon wound its way north into the Greater Antilles. Despite warm waters, persistent wind shear prevented significant strengthening. Executing a slow turn to the north and then the northwest, Gordon made two more landfalls, on eastern Jamaica and eastern Cuba. As Tropical Storm Gordon made its fourth landfall crossing the Florida Keys, it interacted with a cyclone in the upper troposphere and a series of cyclonic lows which lent the storm some sub-tropical characteristics. After a few days as an unusual hybrid of a tropical and a subtropical system in the Gulf of Mexico, the storm re-claimed its tropical storm status and it made another landfall across the Florida peninsula and continued into the Atlantic Ocean. In the Atlantic, Gordon rapidly strengthened to a Category 1 hurricane. Gordon's characteristic briefly approached North Carolina, but ultimately the storm headed south, weakening into a minor tropical storm before making its sixth and final landfall on Florida's east coast. Overall, the storm made six separate landfalls.

Hurricane Gordon caused heavy damage and 1,122 fatalities in Haiti; the storm's effects extended from Costa Rica to North Carolina in the United States. Over Hispaniola, the persistent southerly flow to the east of the storm, combined with the steep upslope motion of the land, generated prolonged rainfall which triggered disastrous flooding and mudslides. The extreme flooding led to an estimated 1,122 fatalities in Haiti, although some reports indicate that up to 2,000 people died. Six deaths were also reported in Costa Rica. Elsewhere, five fatalities were reported in the Dominican Republic, four in Jamaica, two in Panama, and two in Cuba. In Florida, the storm caused eight fatalities and 43 injuries. In Volusia County, 1,236 buildings reported flood damage. In the state, damage totaled $400 million (1994 USD).

Other systems

October subtropical cyclone 
A weak and broad frontal low absorbed the remnants of Tropical Depression Ten in the central Gulf of Mexico. The Weather Prediction Center identified the system as a subtropical storm on October 1. The subtropical storm moved across Florida and the Southeastern United States on October 2 and 3; when it reached the Atlantic Coast, it became an extratropical frontal wave. However, the National Hurricane Center does not confirm the existence of the subtropical cyclone.

Christmas nor'easter 

In addition to the seven named storms, a nor'easter formed in late December. As it entered the warm waters of the Gulf Stream in the Atlantic Ocean, it began to rapidly intensify, exhibiting signs of tropical development, including the formation of an eye. It attained a pressure of 970 millibars on December 23 and 24, and after moving northward, it came ashore near New York City on Christmas Eve. However, due to the uncertain nature of the storm, the National Hurricane Center (NHC) did not classify it as a tropical cyclone.

Storm names 

During the season the following names were used for tropical storms, that formed within the north Atlantic Ocean. These were the same names that had been used during the 1988 season except for Gordon and Joyce, which replaced Gilbert and Joan. The name Gordon was used for the first time this year. Despite Gordon's high death toll and the extensive damage it did, Haiti did not send a representative to the WMO at their meeting the next year; as a result, the name "Gordon" was not retired. As a result, there were no names retired from this list of names and it was subsequently reused during the 2000 season.

Season effects 
This is a table of all of the storms that formed in the 1994 Atlantic hurricane season. It includes their duration, names, landfall(s)—denoted by bold location names—damage, and death totals. Deaths in parentheses are additional and indirect (an example of an indirect death would be a traffic accident), but are still related to that storm. Damage and deaths include totals while the storm was extratropical or a wave or low, and all of the damage figures are in 1994 USD.

See also 

 Atlantic hurricane season
 1994 Pacific hurricane season
 1994 Pacific typhoon season
 1994 North Indian Ocean cyclone season
 South-West Indian Ocean cyclone season: 1993–94, 1994–95
 Australian region cyclone season: 1993–94, 1994–95
 South Pacific cyclone season: 1993–94, 1994–95

References

External links 

 National Hurricane Center preliminary reports on all the storms during the season
 "1994 Atlantic hurricane season: The Tropical Storms Were Killers"
 Monthly Weather Review